Cercamia is a genus of fishes in the family Apogonidae, the cardinalfishes. They are native to the Pacific and Indian Oceans.

Species
The recognized species in this genus are:
 Cercamia cladara J. E. Randall & C. L. Smith, 1988 
 Cercamia eremia (G. R. Allen, 1987) (glassy cardinalfish)
 Cercamia melanogaster G. R. Allen, Erdmann & Mahardini, 2015 (blackbelly cardinalfish)

References

Apogoninae
Marine fish genera
Taxa named by John Ernest Randall